This is a list of African educators, scientists and scholars who were born or active on the African continent.

North Africa

Egypt
 Imhotep fl. (2667–2611 BC), Egyptian polymath
 Muhammad Abduh (1849–1905), Egyptian jurist, religious scholar and liberal reformer, regarded as the founder of Islamic Modernism.
 Abū Kāmil Shujā ibn Aslam (c. 850 – c. 930)
 Sameera Moussa (1917–1952), Egyptian nuclear scientist.
 Al-Jahiz (781–868/869), Afro-Arab scholar of East African descent.
 Arius (c. 250/256–336), Christian priest from Alexandria, Egypt.
 Al-Suyuti (c. 1445–1505), Egyptian writer, religious scholar, juristic expert and teacher.
 Ahmed Zewail (1946–2016), Egyptian-American scientist, awarded the 1999 Nobel Prize in Chemistry.
 Mahmud Ahmad Hamdi al-Falaki (1815–1885), Egyptian cartographer, teacher, Minister of Public Instruction.
 Ismail Mustafa al-Falaki (1825–1901), Egyptian astronomer and mathematician.

Carthage
 Saint Cyprian (c. 210–September 14, 258), bishop of Carthage and early Christian writer.

Tunisia
 Aziza Baccouche (1976–), American physicist and filmmaker born and raised in Tunisia
 Hayet Omri (1981–), Tunisian politician and inventor

Other
 Abbas Ibn Firnas (809–887)
 Nur ad-Din al-Betrugi (died c. 1204)
 Tertullian (ca. 160–ca. 220), Christian Berber author and writer of Christian Latin literature.
 Augustine of Hippo (354–430), Bishop of Hippo Regius and Romanized Berber philosopher and theologian.

Algeria
 Muhammad al-Maghili (died c. 1505), Islamic scholar from Tlemcen in modern-day Algeria.

Morocco
 Rachid Yazami (1953–), French Moroccan scientist best known for his research on lithium ion batteries.

Sudanese

 Mo Ibrahim, (1946–), Sudanese-born British mobile communications entrepreneur and engineer
 Ali M. El-Agraa (1941–), economist
 Mohamed Osman Baloola (1981–), biomedical engineer who works on diabetes monitoring
 Mamoun Beheiry (1925–2002), economist, president of the African Development Bank and twice finance minister
 Nashwa Eassa (19??–), nano-particle physicist
 Ismail El Gizouli, acting president of the IPCC
 Mohamed H.A. Hassan (1947–), mathematician and physicist

East Africa

Ethiopian 

 Rediet Abebe (1991–), Ethiopian computer scientist and was appointed at the Harvard Society of Fellows as the first female computer scientist. 
 Berhane Asfawa (1954–), Ethiopian paleontologist.
 Giday WoldeGabriela (1955–), Ethiopian geologist.
 Gebisa Ejeta (1950–), Ethiopian plant breeder and geneticist who won the 2009 World Food Prize.
 Sossina M. Haile (1966–), professor of Materials Science and Chemical Engineering at the California Institute of Technology.
 Mulugeta Bekele (1947–), Professor of Physics at Addis Ababa University.
 Aklilu Lemma (1934–1997), Ethiopian physician and was co-awarded the 1989 Right Livelihood Award.
 Dessalegn Rahmato (1940–), Ethiopia sociologist and was awarded the 1998 Prince Claus Award.
 Legesse Wolde-Yohannes, Ethiopian horticultural scientist and was co-awarded the 1989 Right Livelihood Award.
 Melaku Worede (1936–), Ethiopian horticultural scientist and was co-awarded the 1989 Right Livelihood Award.
 Gebrekidan Gebresilassie Eshetu (2013–), Ethiopian scientist in Electrochemical Energy Storage at RWTH Aachen University.
 Tewolde Berhan Gebre Egziabher (1940–), Ethiopian environmental scientist and the General Manager of the Environmental Protection Authority of Ethiopia. He was awarded the 2000 Right Livelihood Award and 2006 Champions of the Earth.

Somali 
Osman Aden Abdulle – geneticist; has studied the Somali blood type and its ethnogenesis; in 1987 he jointly discovered with his colleagues a new Rh gene complex producing the rare Cx (Rh9) antigen in the Somali population
Abdusalam Abubakar (1989/90–) – one of the youngest winners of the BT Young Scientist of the Year Award; later went on to win the European Union Contest for Young Scientists for his project,  An Extension of Wiener's Attack on RSA
Hassan al-Jabarti (d. 1774) – mathematician, theologian, astronomer and philosopher, considered one of the great scholars of the 18th century
Amina Said Ali – author, poet, and medical scientist based in Stockholm, Sweden
Ali Said Faqi – scientist and the leading researcher on the design and interpretation of toxicology studies at the MPI research center in Mattawan, Michigan
Jama Musse Jama (1967–) – ethnomathematician and author; known for his research on traditional Somali board games such as Shax and the history of mathematics in the Horn of Africa and the founder of Hargeysa Cultural Centre
Ahmed Mumin Warfa – scientist, specialized in botany and jointly discovered the Cyclamen somalense, the first genus from tropical Africa with his colleague Mats Thulin; the "world's pre-eminent authority on frankincense"; professor at Salt Lake Community College
Shaykh Sufi – popularly known as Sheikh Sufi, was a 19th-century Somali scholar, poet, reformist and astrologist
Ahmed Ismail Samatar – prominent Somali writer, professor and former dean of the Institute for Global Citizenship at Macalester College. He is the editor of Bildhaan: An International Journal of Somali Studies, and brother of Abdi Ismail Samatar, chair of the geography department at the University of Minnesota.
Abdigani Diriye - (born 1986) is a Somali computer scientist and research scientist at IBM Research – Africa, working in the fields of human-computer interaction (HCI), data mining and financial technology (FinTech). Diriye was named a TEDGlobal 2017 fellow, an MIT Technology Review 'Innovator Under 35', and a 'Next Einstein Forum' fellow.
Shaykh Sufi - (b. 1829 - 1904), popularly known as Sheikh Sufi, was a 19th-century Somali scholar, poet, reformist and astrologist.
Abdi Ismail Samatar - (born 1950) is a Somali scholar, writer and professor of geography.

Eritrean 
 Haile Debas (1937–), Eritrean who achieved national recognition as a gastrointestinal investigator and made original contributions to the physiology, biochemistry, and pathophysiology of gastrointestinal peptide hormones.

Kenyan 
 Wangari Maathai (1940–2010), Kenyan environmental and political activist who won the 2004 Nobel Peace Prize.
 Thomas R. Odhiambo (1931–2003), Kenyan entomologist and environmental activist.
 Henry Odera Oruka (1944–1995), Kenyan philosopher known for Sage philosophy project started in the 1970s.
 Calestous Juma (1953–2017), Kenyan internationally recognised authority in the application of science and technology to sustainable development worldwide.
 Paula Kahumbu (1966–), Kenyan wildlife conservationist and Chief Executive Officer of WildlifeDirect.
 Marjorie Oludhe Macgoye (1928–2015), Kenyan poet, novelist and missionary bookseller also known as the  "Mother of Kenyan literature".
 Ngugi wa thion'go (1938–), Kenyan writer and literature academic. 
Richard Leakey (1944–2022), Kenyan paleoanthropologist and wildlife conservationist.
Meja Mwangi (1948–), Award winning Kenyan novelist and writer of plays and children's books.
Grace Ogot (1930–2015), Kenyan author and first anglophone Kenyan female writer to be published, together with Charity Waciuma.

Ugandan 
 Venansius Baryamureeba, Ugandan professor of computer science and educationist.
 Kwatsi Alibaruho, Ugandan-American flight director at NASA.
 Ivan Edwards (physician), Ugandan-American physician and Flight surgeon in the US Air Force Reserve. He started a Child Sponsorship Program for displaced orphans in Uganda.

Tanzanian 

 Fredrick Ishengoma, Tanzanian  scientist and the leading researcher on information systems.

West Africa

Cameroonian 

Éric Essono Tsimi
 Ibrahim Njoya (c. 1860 – c. 1933), ruler of the Bamum people, in what is now western Cameroon credited with developing a semi-syllabic Bamum script which evolved from the rudimentary pictographic script to a more advanced logo graphic script, which he later refined to the semi-syllabic script known to the world today.
Pelkins Ajanoh, Cameroonian graduate of Massachusetts Institute of Technology, invented a novel technology for calibrating radars for self-driving cars while pursuing an internship at General Motors.
Alfred Ngwa, Cameroonian Biochemist with experience and research interest in the use of biotechnology and genomics to understand the evolution and transmission of infectious pathogens, and to develop new interventions towards their elimination

Congo 
 Jean-Jacques Muyembe-Tamfum, Congolese microbiologist, investigated the first Ebola outbreak, and was part of the effort that discovered Ebola as a new disease. In August 2019, he led the research that discovered the most effective treatment for Ebola, mAb114, working with other researchers at the INRB and the National Institute of Health Vaccine Research Center in the US.

Gambian 

 Tumani Corrah is a Gambian clinician whose fields of research include tuberculosis, HIV and malaria.

Ghanaian
 Alexander Anim-Mensah, Ghanaian-American chemical engineer, inventor, and author. He is known for the contributions towards the field of membrane Science and technology.

Laud Anthony Basing, Ghanaian, scientist and innovator

Malian 
 Mohammed Bagayogo (1523–1593), eminent scholar from Timbuktu, Mali.
 Modibo Mohammed Al Kaburi, scholar, Cadi and Jurist, and university professor, from Timbuktu, Mali.
 Cheick Modibo Diarra, (1952–), Malian-born aerospace engineer who contributed to several NASA missions such as Mars Path Finder, the Galileo spacecraft, and the Mars Observer.
 Ahmad Baba (1556–1627), medieval West African writer, scholar, and political provocateur.

Sierra Leonean
Abioseh Davidson Nicol, medical doctor, university principal, poet, author, and discover of the breakdown of insulin in the human body.
Edward Wilmot Blyden III, diplomat, political scientist and educator.
Abu Bakarr Kanu, academic and chemist.
Ogunlade Davidson, academic and engineer.
Noah Arthur Cox-George, academic and economist.
Akintola Josephus Wyse, academic, author and historian.
Aisha Fofana Ibrahim, academic and activist.
Cyril Foray, academic, author and historian.
Arthur Daniel Porter III, academic, author and historian.
Olumbe Bassir, academic, biochemist and activist.
Violet Showers Johnson, academic, author and historian.
Mohamed Juldeh Jalloh, political scientist and politician.
Kandeh Baba Conteh, political scientist and politician. 
Kadi Sesay, feminist, politician and linguist.
Eustace Palmer, academic, literary critic and author.
Omotunde E.G. Johnson, economist and researcher.
Aminata Isatu Kamara, MBA, Academic, and NON Commissioner Officer(U.S. Military)

Nigerian 

Chris Abani (born 27 December 1966), Nigerian and American author
Catherine Obianuju Acholonu (26 October 1951 – 18 March 2014), Nigerian writer, researcher and former lecturer on African Cultural and Gender Studies.
Akin Adesokan, Nigerian writer, scholar and novelist 
Chimamanda Ngozi Adichie (born 15 September 1977), Nigerian writer whose works range from novels to short stories to nonfiction
Toyin Adewale-Gabriel (born 1969), Nigerian writer
Ifi Amadiume (born 23 April 1947), Nigerian poet, anthropologist and essayist
Yemisi Aribisala (born 27 April 1973), Nigerian essayist, writer, painter, and food memoirist
Nnorom Azuonye (born 12 July 1967), publisher, theater director, playwright, poet and advertising professional.
Jonathan O. Chimakonam, logician studying African Philosophy, developed the Ezumezu system of Three-valued logic
Chinwe Nwogo Ezeani, Nigerian Chartered Librarian and the former University Librarian of Nnamdi Azkiwe Library University of Nigeria Nsukka.
Philip Emeagwali, computer scientist mathematician and engineer
Odafe Atogun, Nigerian writer
John Ogbu (1939–2003), Nigerian-American anthropologist and university professor
Chika Okeke-Agulu (born, September 18, 1966), art historian, professor and director of African Studies, Princeton University
 Seyi Oyesola, Nigerian doctor, who co-invented hospital in a box
 Bisi Ezerioha (born 1972), Nigerian engineer, racer and former pharmaceutical executive who has built some of the world's most powerful Honda and Porsche engines.
 Bennet Omalu (born 1968), Nigerian forensic pathologist, who discovered a neurological deterioration that is similar to Alzheimer's disease while conducting an autopsy on former NFL football player Mike Webster. The 2015 film Concussion played by actor Will Smith was released shedding light on the doctor's fight to reveal his discovery despite major pushback from the NFL. 
Suleiman Elias Bogoro is professor of Animal Science, specializing in Biochemistry and Ruminant Nutrition.

Senegalese 
 Cheikh Anta Diop (1923–1986), Senegalese historian, anthropologist, physicist and politician.

Southern Africa

South African 

 Christiaan Barnard (1922–2001), South African cardiac surgeon, who performed the world's first successful human-to-human heart transplant.
 Sydney Brenner (1927–2019), South African biologist, who won the 2002 Nobel prize in Physiology or Medicine.
 Allan McLeod Cormack (1924–1998), South African-born American physicist, who won the 1979 Nobel Prize in Physiology or Medicine.
 Mulalo Doyoyo (born 1970), South African professor, engineer and inventor.
 Trefor Jenkins (born 1932), human geneticist from South Africa, noted for his work on DNA.
 Aaron Klug (1926–2018), Lithuanian-born British chemist and biophysicist, who won the 1982 Nobel Prize in Chemistry. He moved to South Africa at the age of two and studied at the University of Witwatersrand and the University of Cape Town.
 Tshilidzi Marwala (born 1971), South African scientist and inventor.
 Thebe Medupe (born 1973), South African astrophysicist and founding director of Astronomy Africa.
 Azwinndini Muronga, professor of physics and dean of science.
 Philiswa Nomngongo, professor of Analytical Chemistry and the South African Research Chair (SARChI) in nanotechnology for water.
 Himla Soodyall (born 1963), South African human geneticist, known for genetic research into the peoples of sub-Saharan Africa.
 Andries Van Aarde (born 1951), professor of theology at University of Pretoria.
 Quarraisha Abdool Karim, South African HIV researcher

Tanzanian 
 Felix A. Chami, archaeologist and university professor from Tanzania.
 Erasto B. Mpemba (born 1950), Tanzanian scientist and physicist who discovered the eponymous Mpemba effect, a paradoxical phenomenon in which hot water freezes faster than cold water under certain conditions.

African diaspora 
List of African-American inventors and scientists

References

Science and technology in Africa
African educators, scientists and scholars
African educators, scientists and scholars
African educators, scientists and scholars